Avala is a mountain in Serbia, overlooking Belgrade. It is situated in the south-eastern corner of the city and provides a great panoramic view of Belgrade, Vojvodina and Šumadija, as the surrounding area on all sides is mostly lowlands.

Location 

The entire area of the mountain belongs to the Belgrade City area, the majority of it being in the municipality of Voždovac, with the eastern slopes being in the municipality of Grocka, and the southernmost extension in the municipality of Sopot. It is possible that in the future the entire area of Avala will create a separate municipality of Belgrade, named Avalski Venac.

Geography 

Avala is a low type of the Pannonian island mountain, though it is actually the northernmost mountain in Šumadija. Until 600,000 years ago, when the surrounding low areas were flooded by the inner Pannonian Sea, Avala was an island, just as the neighboring mountains (Kosmaj, Fruška Gora, etc.), thus earning its geographical classification. However, Avala remains an "island mountain" as the area around it, Pinosava plateau of the northern Low Šumadija, is low and mostly flat. In the north it extends into the woods of Stepin Lug.

The mountain is built of serpentinite, limestone and magmatic rocks, which are injected in the shape of cone (laccolith). Other peaks include Ladne vode, Zvečara, Sakinac. The Avala had deposits of ores, most notably lead and mercury's ore of cinnabarite but mining activities which can be traced to the pre-Antiquity times. Archeologist Miloje Vasić believed that the vast mines of cinnabarite (mercury-sulfide) on Avala were crucial for the development of the Vinča culture, on the banks of the Danube circa 5700 BC. Settlers of Vinča apparently melted cinnabarite and used it in metallurgy. Mining was active on the mountain at 3000 BC.

In Medieval Serbia mining began in c.1420, after the Law on mines was issued by the Despot Stefan Lazarević in 1412. In this period, the cinnabarite was used for fresco paintings and was exported to Greece. Mining activities ceased by the 1960s, when the last two mines, Šuplja Stena and Crveni Breg, were closed. Šuplja Stena ("Hollow Boulder") was a mercury mine while in Crveni Breg ("Red Hill"), lead, zinc, silver and gold were extracted. Crveni Breg was closed in 1953 and has traces of the usage from the Roman period. It has seven levels, out of which four are flooded, and the stalactites are being formed inside.

Avala is also a location where the mineral avalite, named after the mountain, was found. A greenish mineral, chromian, magnesian or potassic alumosilicate (variety of the mineral illite), it was discovered by Serbian chemist Sima Lozanić who established its formula. Optically examined by the Israeli mineralogist Tamir Grodek who classified it as a member of the mica mineral group.

On the southern slopes, in the area of Ripanj, the closed Tešićev Majdan ("Tešić Quarry") is located. The stone pit was privately owned, but was confiscated by the state after World War II and stopped operating before 1960. In the process of restitution after 2000, the quarry was returned to the surviving owners, but they live abroad so the quarry is still not operational. It is the only known location of kersantite in Serbia, a rare type of greenish granite. For decades, kersantite was used for Belgrade buildings. Features built with this stone include the fountain between the Novi Dvor and Stari Dvor, the bordure of the Hotel Bristol, Small Staircase in Kalemegdan Park, pedestal of the Play of Black Horses statues in front of the House of the National Assembly of Serbia and buildings of Belgrade Cooperative, Elementary School King Petar I, Cathedral Church of St. Michael the Archangel and Main Post Office Building. As the buildings began to deteriorate over time, city authorities showed interest in the quarry, not only for the repairs but also for future construction. For now, when some deteriorated kersantite feature has to be replaced, the artificial stone is used (as in the case of the pedestal of the Play of Black Horses). Geologists suggested to the city to obtain the ownership over the land on which the pit is located and to reopen it. The Belgrade City government announced in 2012 that it will unilaterally explore the pit until it gets reopened and inspected it in 2013. Large amounts of already cut kersantite were found.  Locals have been illegally extracting the stone and crushing it to use as road cover. After the political change in Belgrade in late 2013, the motion was dropped.

On the mountain itself, there are several springs, of which Sakinac is best known. Despite being the only mountain in the area, Avala is not a source of many rivers. The Topčiderka river, originating in the woods of Lipovička šuma on the south-west, flows on the western slopes of Avala, while the river Bolečica flows on the eastern slopes. Other minor flows include the Vranovac, a tributary to the Bolečica. A small artificial lake near the village of Pinosava was  created on the western slope of the mountain. The settlements in the area are notorious for problems with shortages of drinking water during summer.

Wildlife

Protection 

Despite being officially protected for almost 150 years, it was only in 2007 that preservation plans for the mountain were made. That way, Avala entered a circle of protected green areas of Belgrade, which also included the mountain of Kosmaj, the island of Veliko Ratno Ostrvo and the woods of Stepin Lug, with the forests of Košutnjak and Topčider to be added next. Protected areas of Avala spread over 

Some areas within the mountain are additionally protected., including the "Complex of mountain beech, oak, maple and elm", which is in the first level of protection. It is located in the valley of the Vranovica stream, close to the "Čarapićev Brest" visitors' complex.

In early September 2020, unknown persons began clearing the field in the protected downhill of Avala. The field was a recorded habitat of Caspian whipsnake. Illegal construction of the complex of houses, without any permits, began in January 2021. Inspections closed it, but the construction continued before it was halted. Demolition of the complex began in August 2022.

Plant life 

Avala is known for its diverse plant life, despite not being a tall mountain. There are over 600 plant species living on the mountain. Some of them are protected by the law as natural rarities, like certain types of laburnum, box tree, black broom, common holly and martagon lily. The area is also abundant in medicinal herbs, like the early-purple orchid and belladonna. Thus, the meadow plant communities are rare. Other protected plant species include common yew and oregano. High woods mostly consist of durmast oak, Turkey oak, hornbeam, beech, linden, black pine, black locust and other trees.

Animal life 

Almost 100 species of birds live on Avala, including strictly protected Eurasian sparrowhawk, European honey buzzard and European green woodpecker. Total of 21 bird species is protected. Other species include common buzzard, stock dove, common kestrel, and Eurasian scops owl.

A section of the mountain is organized as a game hunting ground.

Name 

In the Middle Ages, the town of Žrnov or "Avalski Grad" (Avala town) was located on top of Avala. In 1442. it was conquered by the Ottoman Empire, which built a new town in Žrnov's place as a counter-fortress to the Belgrade city fort, and renamed it "havale", which originally comes from Arabic and means "obstacle" or "shelter".

Human history 

The mountain has been protected since 1859 as a natural monument, or, by the modern standards, "sight of the exquisite values". That year, Serbian ruling prince Miloš Obrenović issued an order for the Avala to get fenced and protected that way. He also banned construction of houses on the mountain itself.

In the early 20th century plans were made for the further forestation of the mountain. In his last visit to Serbia in 1903, Austro-Hungarian naturalist Felix Philipp Kanitz noted that the mountain will become "another exceptional excursion area", after the Topčider park. Remains of the medieval Žrnov were removed in 1934 to make way for the Monument to the Unknown Hero. The destruction of Žrnov, which was demolished with dynamite, caused a massive discontent among the citizens of Belgrade. In the period of the Kingdom of Yugoslavia, the mountain was declared a national park, in 1936. In 1946, by the ukaz of the Presidium of the National Assembly of Serbia, Avala was reduced to the status of the "public property of general benefit" and placed under direct management of the Government of Serbia.

Avala was a key point during the Belgrade Offensive in October 1944, a fighting for the liberation of Belgrade in World War II. Germans halted their mechanized units along the Smederevo road, at Mali Mokri Lug, continued equipped with the light weapons and spread over Avala. German units were commanded by lieutenant general , who was killed during the battle. Germans also had a 7th SS division at the mountain, but after the joint attack of Yugoslav Partisans and Red Army, Belgrade was liberated on 20 October 1944.

In 1965, a  Avala TV Tower was constructed, one of the tallest structures in the Balkans, by the architects Uglješa Bogunović, Slobodan Janjić and M. Krstić. The tower was destroyed during the NATO bombing of Serbia in 1999. Its total reconstruction began in 2006 and was officially opened at a ceremony on 21 April 2010. The new tower is almost the exact replica of the destroyed one, including the unique three-feet base. Belgrade's General Urbanistic Plan (GUP) for the 2001–2021 period defines the mountain as a sports and recreation area.

During the 1972 Yugoslav smallpox outbreak, Avala functioned as a quarantine. The patients were first placed in the mountaineering camp "Čarapićev Brest", which was adapted into the ad-hoc hospital. The patients were later relocated closer to the main road, in the "1000 Ruža" motel.

The 1st Air Defense Missile Battalion, one of the "Neva" battalions of the 250th Air Defense Missile Brigade, is located in Zuce, on the eastern slopes of Avala.

Settlements 

Settlements near the mountain are not much populous. They include Ripanj (on the south, the largest one, with a population of  11,088 by the 2011 census of population), Pinosava (on the west, 3,151), Zuce (on the north-east, 2,001), Beli Potok (on the north, 3,621), all in the municipality of Voždovac, and Vrčin (on the east, 9,088), in the municipality of Grocka.

Administration 

A motion is in the process of creating a new municipality called Avalski Venac, which would include all these settlements and possible few others, but Zoran Alimpić, the acting mayor of Belgrade from September 2007 to August 2008, stated that new municipalities will probably not be formed before 2011 or 2012. The idea was later put on hiatus.

Transportation 

Avala is well connected with Belgrade and other parts of Serbia via roads, highway and railroads.

Avalski drum ("Avala road") is an extension of the Boulevard of the Liberation, which directly connects the mountain to downtown Belgrade (via neighborhoods of Selo Rakovica, Jajinci, Banjica, Voždovac, Autokomanda, Karađorđev Park and Slavija). On the mountain, Avalski drum divides in three:
 one section is a circular road which goes to the top of the mountain.
 second section continues to the south-west, through Ripanj, Lipovička Šuma and Barajevo, and makes a connection to the major road in the western Serbia, Ibarska magistrala.
 third section goes south-east, parallel to the highway, through Trešnja and Ralja and further to the south and east (where it meets the highway).
Sub-Avalan settlements are directly connected to Belgrade by the bus lines of the city's public transportation, with terminus in the Belgrade's neighborhood of Trošarina.

The Belgrade–Niš highway, a section of one of the major European roads, European route E75, runs east of the mountain, through Vrčin. North of the mountain runs Kružni put, the most important road in the southern outskirts of Belgrade, which connects all the southern sections of the city. It is also a projected route of the future Belgrade beltway which would continue through the Bolečica river valley and the projected Vinča-Omoljica bridge over the Danube into Vojvodina.

Railroads also run on both sides of the mountain. Eastern branch is a section of the Belgrade-Niš railroad. It runs through the tunnel under the Avala at Beli Potok and then through Včrin. Western branch runs through Ripanj and the long "Ripanj tunnel" (though not under the Avala), and continues into western Serbia and further into Montenegro, as part of the Belgrade–Bar railway.

Tourism 
 

Avala is a traditional picnic resort for Belgraders, but its capacities are not being used much. In 1984 number of tourists was only 15,700 despite over 1.5 million of inhabitants in Belgrade. Some attractions and capacities on the mountain include:
 Šuplja Stena, a former very popular children's resort, located on the mountain's wind rose; after the 1990s it turned into a residential place refugees from the Yugoslav Wars but was reconstructed and reopened in 2012;
 Avala Tower, landmark TV Tower that was destroyed during the 1999 NATO bombing of Serbia, later rebuilt in 2010; In June 2017 the tourist complex was opened at the base of the tower. It includes, among other facilities, a restaurant, ethno-gallery, souvenir shop, sports fields and outdoor gym.
 Weekend-settlement on the southern slopes;
 Motel "1000 Ruža" in Beli Potok; now adapted into the 3-star hotel;
 Hotel "Avala"; built in 1928 by the Russian architect Viktor Lukomsky. Russian sculptor Aleksandr Zagrodnyuk sculpted two sphinx which are located at the hotel's north side, on the staircase to the hotel's terrace. The hotel was privatised in 2005, but in 2007 it was declared a cultural monument;
 Trešnja resort, in the southernmost extension of the mountain;
 Mountaineering camp of Čarapićev  brest; Projected by the architect Slobodan Mihajlović in the 1960s, on the northern slopes of the Avala, above Beli Potok. It was renovated in 2003;
 Mountaineering camp of Mitrovićev dom. It was made of wood and stone and named (“Mitrović Home”) after dr Dušan Špirta Mitrović, a medical doctor and volunteer on the Salonika front. In 1981 it was declared a cultural monument but in 2014 it burned to the ground in the fire. In 2016–17 it was reconstructed to look exactly the same way it looked before the fire.
 One of only three officially designated campsites in Belgrade by 2018 is located on the mountain. A small camping ground, it is situated on the slopes in the Ripanj section.
 Hiking trail "Sakinac", fully revitalized in September 2020. Formerly paved with asphalt concrete, it is covered with the crushed stone from Struganik. It connects the Sakinac water spring to the Mitrovićev dom, on the top of the mountain. There, it forks in two, one end reaching the tower while the other leads to the church.

Monuments on Avala 

Special attractions of the Avala are several monuments. They include:

 Monument to the Unknown Hero – dedicated to the unknown Serbian soldier from World War I; sculptured by Ivan Meštrović in the form of mausoleum with 8 caryatides (columns shaped like female figures, in this case each one representing a woman from a different historical region of Yugoslavia), it was completed in 1938. An earlier monument was erected in 1915 at the location by the German soldiers, on the orders of Field marshal August von Mackensen.
 Monument to the Soviet war veterans – dedicated to the members of the Soviet military delegation which died in an airplane crash on the Avala on October 19, 1964. They were flying to Belgrade for the celebration of the 20th anniversary of the liberation of Belgrade in World War II, October 20, 1944, as Red Army forces participated in the expulsion of Germans. Among those killed in the crash were Marshal Sergey Semyonovich Biryuzov, chief of the General Staff and first deputy defense minister of the Soviet Union and General Vladimir Ivanovich Zhdanov. The monument was sculptured by Jovan Kratohvil.
 Memorial Park – dedicated to the victims of the World War II
 Monument to Vasa Čarapić – dedicated to Vasa Čarapić, one of the leaders of the First Serbian Uprising in 1804 and liberator of Belgrade from the Turks, built in Beli Potok, his birthplace, near the mountaineers home Čarapićev brest. It was sculptured in 1991 by Dušan Nikolić.

Churches 

Small church dedicated to the Saint Despot Stefan Lazarević was built in the immediate vicinity of the Avala Tower and Monument to the Unknown Hero. The foundations were consecrated by the Patriarch of the Serbian Orthodox Church, Irinej, in 2015. Made of white pine and designed by deacon Miroslav Nikolić, it covers only . The bell tower, built next to the church, is also made of wood. The church contains epitrachelion of Saint Nectarios of Aegina and pillow of Saint Petka.

Mountaineering camp 

Annually, from July 1 until July 10, a traditional camp of Serbian mountaineers is held on the Avala. Among other mountaineering activities, there are competitions in:
 Orienteering
 Climbing (on an outdoor Climbing wall)
 Mountain biking
 Mountain running

Ski center 

The first skiing competition in Yugoslavia was held on Avala in 1929 and the first local, Serbian competition after World War II was also held here, in 1946. The usual route was the one starting at the logger's cabin and ending all the way to the foothills above Ripanj. The tracks were quite crude. Despite low altitude, construction of the ski resort, with sports and recreational venues and a cable car have been proposed in 1994 and 2005. The construction of the complex, which is planned to be operational over the entire year thanks to the artificial snowing system (skiing specifically from November to February), should start in 2019. The piste will start in the immediate vicinity of the tower and end at the logger's cabin. Due to the altitude and the climate, the north-western slope, in the direction of Pinosava, is chosen. The track has been labeled as the "blue", which means it is of and intermediate level of difficulty.

Phase I includes the construction of the piste, ski lift, training trail, snowmaking cannons, decorative lights, parking lots and special machinery. Phase II comprises the building of the bobsled on rails track, zip-line, mini golf course, artificial climbing rock, children playground and an adventure park. Projected price is €5 million. As the project includes cutting of the mountain forest, the opposition to the project amounted and no works began before 2020.

See also 

 List of mountains in Serbia

References

Sources 

 Mala Prosvetina Enciklopedija, Third edition (1986), Vol.I; Prosveta; 
 Jovan Đ. Marković (1990): Enciklopedijski geografski leksikon Jugoslavije; Svjetlost-Sarajevo; 
 Turističko područje Beograda, "Geokarta", 2007,

External links 

 Mountaineering camp on Avala 

Mountains of Serbia
Geography of Belgrade
Šumadija
Military monuments and memorials
Rhodope mountain range